Never Trust a Liberal Over 3—Especially a Republican is the tenth book by American far-right author Ann Coulter, published on October 14, 2013. The majority of the book's content is collections of Coulter's more recent columns.

References

2013 non-fiction books
Books by Ann Coulter
Books critical of modern liberalism in the United States
English-language books
Regnery Publishing books